Escadron de Transport 3/62 Ventoux is a French Air and Space Force squadron located at Évreux-Fauville Air Base, Eure, France which operates the CASA CN235M-200/300.

See also

 List of French Air and Space Force aircraft squadrons

References

French Air and Space Force squadrons